AVN may refer to:

Medicine
 Atrioventricular node, special region of conducting tissue in the heart
 Avascular necrosis, medical condition

Transport
 Air Vanuatu, by ICAO airline code
 Avonmouth railway station, UK, by National Rail code

Companies and organisations
 AVN (magazine), Adult Video News, trade magazine for the pornographic industry
 AVN (Albania), television network
 Australian Vaccination-risks Network, anti-vaccination lobby group
 FK AVN, former name of FK ASK (1923–1970), former Latvian football club
 Agencia Venezolana de Noticias, Venezuelan state news agency
 Australian Army Aviation

Other uses
 Avon (county), historic county in England, Chapman code
 AVN Award, American pornographic film award
 Alien vs Ninja, 2010 Japanese film 
 Audio-Visual Navigation, feature of some motor vehicles